The 2004 BCR Open Romania was a tennis tournament played on outdoor clay courts. It was the 12th edition of the event known that year as the BCR Open Romania, and was part of the International Series of the 2004 ATP Tour. It took place at the Arenele BNR in Bucharest, Romania, from September 13 through September 19, 2004.

Finals

Singles

 José Acasuso defeated  Igor Andreev 6–3, 6–0
 It was Acasuso's 1st singles title of the year and the 2nd of his career.

Doubles

 Lucas Arnold Ker /  Mariano Hood defeated  José Acasuso /  Óscar Hernández 7–6(7–5), 6–1

References

External links
 ITF tournament edition details

Romanian Open
BCR Open Romania
BCR Open Romania
BCR Open Romania